Charles Leclerc (born 1997), is a Monegasque racing driver.

Charles Leclerc may also refer to:

Charles-Antoine Leclerc de La Bruère (1716–1754), French historian and diplomat
Charles Leclerc de Landremont (1739–1818) French general
Charles Leclerc (general, born 1772) (1772–1802), French general